Katherine Graham may refer to:
 Katherine Graham (golfer)
 Katharine Graham, publisher of the Washington Post